Darr Sann Ye (born Sann Ye; 1933) is a Burmese woman who captured Major Zin Bo (also known as Kim Jin-su), a North Korean military officer who was involved in the Rangoon bombing of 9 October 1983. The bombing was an assassination attempt on South Korean President Chun Doo-hwan.

Life 
Darr Sann Ye was born in 1933 in Phaungdawthi village, Daik-U, Bago Division, Burma. Growing up during the colonial era, she was not educated. At age 14, she married Nyo Gyi, a train conductor. They couple divorced after having two daughters. She and her eldest daughter Thein Myint moved to Rangoon. She survived by selling smuggled movie tickets there. She ran a tavern and liquor shop near Pazundaung Creek and often carried a knife in her back pocket for protection. She married Soe Tint, and they had a son. Three years before her husband's death, Sann Ye went to Taunggyi, Shan State in 2000, where her eldest daughter lived. She served as a nun for 16 years.

On 10 October 1983, at 21:00, she saw a strange man diving in Nyaungtan harbour. She suspected the man was Zin Bo. She immediately jumped into the creek and captured him. She and four men, including Bo Gyi and Shwe Min Thar, shot to fame overnight for their heroic actions. She was honored by the Burmese government for her hard work. As she got older, she became homeless and survived by begging on the Hledan flyover. Following the 2021 Myanmar coup d'état, she participated in anti-coup movements.

Popular culture 
She was portrayed by Moht Moht Myint Aung in 2009 film Darr Sann Ye. She is the subject of a documentary film by Nyein Nyein Aung which depicted her life and the capture of Zin Bo.

References

External links
Interview with Darr Sann Ye at 7Day TV Talk Show

1933 births
Burmese women
Living people